Alexander Richard Fowler (19 September 1847 – 22 July 1911) was an Australian politician.

Fowler was born in Leamington Spa in Warwickshire in 1847. In January 1893 he was elected to the Tasmanian House of Assembly, representing the seat of North Launceston, but he was defeated later that year. He returned to the House in 1897 as one of the members for Launceston, serving until his resignation in 1901. He died in 1911 in Launceston.

References

1847 births
1911 deaths
Members of the Tasmanian House of Assembly